Rodigo is a comune (municipality) in the Province of Mantua in the Italian region Lombardy, located about  east of Milan and about  northwest of Mantua.

Rodigo borders the following municipalities: Castellucchio, Ceresara, Curtatone, Gazoldo degli Ippoliti, Goito, Porto Mantovano.

Twin towns
 Berg, Germany, since 2004

References

External links
 Official website

Cities and towns in Lombardy